Chakra Urqu Quechua chakra field, urqu mountain, "field mountain", also spelled Chajra Orkho) or Ch'aqra Urqu (Quechua ch'aqra ford, "ford mountain") is a  mountain in the Andes of Bolivia. It is situated in the Potosí Department, Nor Lípez Province, Colcha "K" Municipality. Chakra Urqu lies northeast of the mountains Chiwana and Millu Urqu and southeast of Kachi Unu.

References 

Mountains of Potosí Department